Kurana may refer to:

 Kurana, Sri Lanka, a village in Sri Lanka
 Kurana, Uttar Pradesh, a village in India
 Kurana, Bhopal, a village in India